is a manufacturer of capacitors of various types, and is one of the largest manufacturers of capacitors in the world, headquartered in Karasuma Oike, Nakagyō-ku, Kyoto, Japan. In 1950, it separated from the Nii Works Co., established itself as Kansai-Nii Works and completed its first factory by 1956. In 1961, it adopted the Nichicon name and has been using it, or a variant thereof, ever since.

In 2011 and 2012 Nichicon spun off several major factories into independent subsidiaries, and established representative branches in foreign countries, thus realigning its corporate infrastructure.

Early 2000s capacitor issues

From 2001 to 2004, Nichicon produced defective capacitors ("HM" and "HN" series) that were used by major computer manufacturers, including Dell, Hewlett-Packard, and Apple. No explanation has been given for the production runs of defective capacitors, but some sources claimed that these capacitors were either overfilled with electrolyte, or were constructed using electrolyte that was prone to leaking, causing premature failure in any equipment using them. This issue was not related to the Taiwanese capacitor plague.

In 2010 Dell settled a civil lawsuit concerning its shipment of at least 11.8 million computers from May 2003 to July 2005 that used faulty Nichicon components and were prone to major failure.

References

External links 

Nichicon Corporation 

Electronics companies of Japan
Capacitor manufacturers
Manufacturing companies based in Kyoto
Companies listed on the Tokyo Stock Exchange
Companies listed on the Osaka Exchange
Electronics companies established in 1950
Japanese companies established in 1950
Japanese brands